The k.k. Civil-Mädchen-Pensionat Wien was a women's teacher's college in Vienna, Austria, between 1786 and 1919. The school was founded in 1786 by Madame Luzac on permission by Emperor Joseph II, with the purpose of educating girls from the middle classes to professional teachers. It was a pioneer institution in Austria for its time.

References
 Franz Branky: Das k. k. Civil-Mädchen-Pensionat in Wien. Eine Denkschrift zur Säcularfeier der im Jahre 1786 vom Kaiser Josef II. zur Heranbildung von Lehrerinnen und Erzieherinnen gegründeten Bildungsstätte, Selbstverlag des k. k. Civil-Mädchen-Pensionates, Wien 1886

18th century in Vienna
Schools in Vienna
Educational institutions established in 1786
Educational institutions disestablished in 1919
1780s in Austria
1919 disestablishments in Austria
18th century in Austria
Former women's universities and colleges
Universities and colleges in Austria
History of women in Austria